1,3-Indandione is an organic compound with the molecular formula C6H4(CO)2CH2.  A yellow solid, it is classified as a vicinal diketone on an indane framework.

1,2-Indandione is used in the first stage of forensic identification of latent fingerprints.  It is particularly useful for paper, and for items printed with thermal inks such as receipts.  Amino acids left behind by the human hand may be developed into fingerprints by the use of it; the results, photographed with a special filter under a strong yellow-green fluorescent or green laser.  It is usually the first method employed in a sequential analysis aimed at the production of evidence of a grade suitable for use in the courtroom. 

1,2-Indanedione is prepared by oxidation of 1-indanone with selenium dioxide.

See also
1,3-Indandione

References 

Indandiones